Karneval may refer to:
 Karneval, the German name for some instances of the Carnival in Germany, Switzerland and Austria
 Karneval, a 1975 song by Marianne Rosenberg.
 Karneval (manga), a Japanese manga and anime series

See also
 Carnival (disambiguation)